Melanie Bolaños (born 23 March 1994) is a Mexican judoka.

She is the silver medallist of the 2017 Judo Grand Prix Cancún in the +78 kg category.

References

External links
 

1994 births
Living people
Mexican female judoka
21st-century Mexican women